Peter Landau (26 February 1935 – 23 May 2019) was a German jurist, legal historian and expert on canon law.

After going to school in Berlin, where he was born, and Eisenberg, Thuringia, Landau studied law, history, and philosophy at the Free University of Berlin, at University of Freiburg, and University of Bonn. After graduating, he served as the assistant of Stephan Kuttner at Yale University. After his doctoral promotion in 1964 and a habilitating in 1964, Landau accepted a call to University of Regensburg where he became a regular professor. In 1970/71 he served as Prorector of that university and in 1978/79 he was the Dean of the faculty of law. His career included research at University of California, Berkeley (1977) and a lecturer's post as a visiting professor at University of Chicago (1984). In 1985 he was accepted into the Bavarian Academy of Sciences and Humanities. When Landau rejected calls to University of Frankfurt and University of California, Berkeley, he became professor of German legal history, recent history of private law, church law, civil law, and for philosophy of law and politics  at University of Munich. This office included the post as director of the Leopold Wenger Institute for Legal History. While in Munich, Landau served also as the dean of the Legal Faculty from 1993 to 1995.

In 1990/91 Landau visited the Institute for Advanced Study in Princeton, New Jersey. He was president of the Society for Medieval Canon Law at Zurich, Switzerland, from 1988 to 2000 and since 1993 he was a member of the advisory board of the Max Planck Institute for European History of Law at Frankfurt am Main. He was also president of the Stephan Kuttner Institute of Medieval Canon Law.
Landau was considered one of the leading experts on canon law worldwide and mostly worked on medieval church law, and evangelical church law. He was moreover interested in philosophy of law and political philosophy. Landau held honorary doctorates of the Institute of Canon Law at University of Munich, of University of Basel and Panthéon-Assas University.

Landau's research areas outside of the narrower subject also included the Communist and first Bavarian Prime Minister Kurt Eisner (USPD). Landau called for the  Münchner Promenadeplatz to be renamed Kurt-Eisner-Platz.

Publications 
 
 
 
  (see: decretal)

References

External links 
 
 Page about Landau at the Stephan Kuttner Institute of Medieval Canon Law, Munich

German jurists
20th-century German historians
German male non-fiction writers
1935 births
2019 deaths
Corresponding Fellows of the Medieval Academy of America
Academic staff of the University of Regensburg